The 2021–22 season is Persija Jakarta's 88th competitive season. This season is Persija's 27th consecutive season in the top flight since professional competition was formed in 1994. The season covers the period from 27 August 2021 to 30 April 2022.

Coaching staff

Management

|-

 
|}

New contracts

Transfers

In

Out

Loan In

Loan Out

Squad information

First team squad

Pre-season

Friendly Matches

2021 Menpora Cup

Group stage

Group B

Matches

Knockout Phase

Quarter-finals

Semi-finals

Finals

Competitions

Overview 

{| class="wikitable" style="text-align: center"
|-
!rowspan=2|Competition
!colspan=8|Record
!rowspan=2|Started round
!rowspan=2|Final position / round
!rowspan=2|First match	
!rowspan=2|Last match
|-
!
!
!
!
!
!
!
!
|-
| Liga 1

| Matchday 1
| Matchday 34
| 6 September 2021
| 31 March 2022
|-
! Total

Liga 1

League table

Results summary

Results by matchday

Matches

First Round
Series 1

Series 2

Series 3

Second Round
Series 4

Series 5

Series 6

Notes

References

Persija Jakarta
Persija Jakarta seasons